Howard Warner McCollum (February 28, 1933 – October 11, 2009) was an American football coach and college athletics administrator.  He was the 13th head football coach at Eureka College in Eureka, Illinois serving for 11 seasons, from 1979 to 1989, and compiling a record of 26–71–3. He also served as the college's athletic director, retiring in 1997.

Head coaching record

College

References

External links
 

1933 births
2009 deaths
Eureka Red Devils athletic directors
Eureka Red Devils football coaches
High school football coaches in Illinois
High school football coaches in Missouri
Truman State University alumni
People from Kirksville, Missouri
Coaches of American football from Missouri